Tomislav Ivković (born 11 August 1960) is a Croatian professional football manager, executive and former player.

During his playing career, which spanned two decades, he competed mostly in Portugal, appearing for five clubs including Sporting CP. Ivković was also a Yugoslavian international in the late 1980s and early 1990s, representing the nation in one World Cup and one European Championship.

In 2010, he started working as a manager. During his managerial career, Ivković managed Međimurje, Lokomotiva, Al Faisaly, Slaven Belupo, Rudeš, Inter Zaprešić, Željezničar and Borac Banja Luka.

Before becoming its manager, from January until April 2022, he worked as sporting director of Borac.

Club career
Ivković was born in Zagreb, PR Croatia, Yugoslavia. He started his professional career playing for hometown club Dinamo Zagreb in 1978, moving to Dinamo Vinkovci in January 1983 and soon after to Red Star Belgrade.

In 1985, Ivković transferred to his first foreign club as he joined Tirol Innsbruck from Austria, where he played until 1988. After short spells with Wiener Sport-Club and Genk, he moved to Sporting CP in 1989, and remained there for the following four seasons, rarely missing a game, although he did not collect any silverware.

Ivković's final years were also spent in Portugal, with Estoril, Vitória Setúbal, Belenenses and Estrela Amadora, before retiring in 1998. Prior to Estrela, he contributed with six matches for Salamanca's 1997 promotion to the La Liga, retiring finally at 38.

International career
Ivković earned 38 caps for the Yugoslav national team, between 1983 and 1991. His first major tournament was UEFA Euro 1984 in France, where he was second-choice behind Zoran Simović: the nation lost all of its three group matches at the tournament, and his only appearance came in the second game, a 0–5 defeat to Denmark; during the same year, he also won the bronze medal at the 1984 Summer Olympics in Los Angeles.

Ivković went on to start for Yugoslavia at the 1990 FIFA World Cup in Italy, appearing in all of the team's five games before they were defeated by Argentina on penalties in the quarter-finals: in that match, he became famous for saving Diego Maradona's kick during the penalty shootout (mere months earlier, he had already saved a penalty from the same player in UEFA Cup action, when Sporting played Napoli, and the two allegedly had a bet on the possible outcome of another penalty before their World Cup match, which the Yugoslav won).

His final international was a September 1991 friendly match away against Sweden.

Managerial career
Starting in 2004, Ivković was the goalkeeping coach of the Croatia national team, during Zlatko Kranjčar's time as head coach. He left the post in July 2006, as the contracts of the entire coaching staff were not renewed after the national team failed to reach the knock-out stages of the 2006 World Cup.

In 2007, Ivković began his sole managerial career, first as an assistant manager at United Arab Emirates' Al-Shaab. Two years later, he had his first bench experience, serving as assistant manager at Persepolis.

In April 2010, Ivković got his first job as manager at Međimurje, in the 1. HNL. During his short one-month spell, the team recorded two wins, one draw and four defeats, eventually ranking in 15th position, out of 16 teams, with the subsequent relegation. After Međimurje, Ivković worked as a manager at Lokomotiva, Al Faisaly, Slaven Belupo, Rudeš and Inter Zaprešić.

On 18 June 2021, he became the new manager of Bosnian Premier League club Željezničar. In his first game as Željezničar manager, Ivković's team drew against Borac Banja Luka in a league match on 17 July 2021. Ivković's first loss as the club's manager was against Tuzla City in a league game a week later, on 24 July. He guided the team to his first win as manager in a league game against Posušje on 31 July 2021. In his first ever Sarajevo derby, Ivković's Željezničar lost to fierce city rivals Sarajevo in a league match on 22 September 2021. On 24 December 2021, he terminated his contract with Željezničar and left the club.

Three months after becoming its sporting director, on 4 April 2022, Ivković was named as Borac Banja Luka's new manager following Nemanja Miljanović's resignation. Ivković's debut was a 1–1 home draw with Zrinjski Mostar on 9 April 2022. He won his first game on 23 April, defeating Radnik Bijeljina 1–0 at home. Ivković lost his first game on 15 May 2022, with a 2–1 away defeat against Sloboda Tuzla. He left Borac in June 2022.

Executive career
On 10 January 2022, Ivković became sporting director of Bosnian Premier League club Borac Banja Luka. He left the post on 4 April 2022 to become Borac's manager.

Managerial statistics

Honours

Player
Dinamo Zagreb
Yugoslav First League: 1981–82
Yugoslav Cup: 1979–80

Red Star Belgrade
Yugoslav First League: 1983–84
Yugoslav Cup: 1984–85

Salamanca
Segunda División: 1996–97

Yugoslavia
Summer Olympics third place: 1984
Mediterranean Games: 1979

Manager
Lokomotiva
1. HNL runner-up: 2012–13
Croatian Cup runner-up: 2012–13

References

External links

National team data 

1960 births
Living people
Footballers from Zagreb
Association football goalkeepers
Yugoslav footballers
Yugoslavia international footballers
Mediterranean Games gold medalists for Yugoslavia
Competitors at the 1979 Mediterranean Games
Mediterranean Games medalists in football
Footballers at the 1980 Summer Olympics
Footballers at the 1984 Summer Olympics
Olympic footballers of Yugoslavia
Olympic bronze medalists for Yugoslavia
Olympic medalists in football
Medalists at the 1984 Summer Olympics
UEFA Euro 1984 players
1990 FIFA World Cup players
Croatian footballers
GNK Dinamo Zagreb players
HNK Cibalia players
Red Star Belgrade footballers
FC Wacker Innsbruck players
Wiener Sport-Club players
K.R.C. Genk players
Sporting CP footballers
G.D. Estoril Praia players
Vitória F.C. players
C.F. Os Belenenses players
UD Salamanca players
C.F. Estrela da Amadora players
Yugoslav First League players
Austrian Football Bundesliga players
Belgian Pro League players
Primeira Liga players
Segunda División players
Yugoslav expatriate footballers
Expatriate footballers in Austria
Yugoslav expatriate sportspeople in Austria
Expatriate footballers in Belgium
Yugoslav expatriate sportspeople in Belgium
Expatriate footballers in Portugal
Croatian expatriate footballers
Croatian expatriate sportspeople in Portugal
Expatriate footballers in Spain
Croatian expatriate sportspeople in Spain
Croatian football managers
NK Međimurje managers
NK Lokomotiva Zagreb managers
Al-Faisaly FC managers
NK Slaven Belupo managers
NK Rudeš managers
NK Inter Zaprešić managers
FK Željezničar Sarajevo managers
FK Borac Banja Luka managers
Croatian Football League managers
Saudi Professional League managers
Premier League of Bosnia and Herzegovina managers
Croatian expatriate football managers
Expatriate football managers in Saudi Arabia
Croatian expatriate sportspeople in Saudi Arabia
Expatriate football managers in Bosnia and Herzegovina
Croatian expatriate sportspeople in Bosnia and Herzegovina
Persepolis F.C. non-playing staff